Hubert Foster McLean (18 July 1907 – 24 April 1997), known as Hugh McLean, was a New Zealand rugby union player who played for the All Blacks between 1930 and 1936.

He was educated at Hastings Boys' High School and Napier Boys' High School where he was in the 1st XV in 1923. He played in Hastings and then Wellington where he made his first class debut. He debuted for the All Blacks in 1930 in two tests. He toured Australia in 1932 and 1934, and his 14 games with the 1935-36 All Blacks included the Irish, Welsh and English internationals. He represented New Zealand in 29 matches including 9 tests; with 50 points for New Zealand (16 tries, conversion) including 9 test points (3 tries).

He was included in a New Zealand rowing eight to go to the 1928 Olympics, but the team was unable to go to the games because of lack of funds.

He served as an officer with the 2nd New Zealand Expeditionary Force (2NZEF) during World War II.

With Ronald Bush he was one of the founders of the New Zealand Barbarians in 1937, and captained their first game against Auckland in 1938.

He came from a rugby family, one brother was the journalist and author Terry McLean (T.P.). He was born in Wanganui and died in Auckland.

References

External links
Hugh McLean at All Blacks.com

1907 births
1997 deaths
New Zealand rugby union players
New Zealand international rugby union players
New Zealand male rowers
People educated at Hastings Boys' High School
People educated at Napier Boys' High School
Rugby union players from Whanganui